Hamad Al Kooheji is a Bahraini politician, merchant, and social activist. He was sworn into the Council of Representatives on December 12, 2018, for the First District in Muharraq Governorate.

House of Representatives
He entered the political arena when he ran for the First District in Muharraq governorate. In the first round, on November 24, 2018, he received 3,804 votes for 46.23%, forcing a second round on December 1. A campaign was launched against his family on Twitter. In the second round, however, he defeated independent opponent, Muhammad al-Husseini, with 4,171 votes for 53.86%.

References

Bahraini businesspeople
Bahraini politicians
Bahraini Sunni Muslims
Bahraini people of Iranian descent
Year of birth missing (living people)
Living people